The High Fens, which were declared a nature reserve in 1957, are an upland area, a plateau region in Liège Province, in the east of Belgium and adjoining parts of Germany, between the Ardennes and the Eifel highlands. The reserve is a rich ecological endowment of Belgium covered with alpine sphagnum raised bogs (not "fens" as the name would imply) both on the plateau and in the valley basin; the bogs, which are over 10,000 years old, with their unique subalpine flora, fauna and microclimate, are key to the conservation work of the park.

In 1966, the European Council awarded the "Diploma of Conservation" to the High Fens, for their ecological value. In 2008, Belgium has added the High Fens to its tentative list of UNESCO World Heritage sites.

Geography

The High Fens, established as a reserve in 1957, with their high altitude and unique location, consist mainly of raised bogs, and low, grass- or wood-covered hills, moorland and forest. The provincial capital of Liège is to its west, the German border is to the east and the dark forested hills of the Ardennes surround the southern part. The park stretches between Eupen in the north, Monschau in the east, Spa in the west and Malmedy in the south. It stretches north of Malmedy as far as Eupen and marks the end of the Ardennes proper. It is contiguous with the Eifel hills, which stretch east from the German border to form the large Deutsch–Belgischer Naturpark. Large urban centres in the vicinity of the reserve are Eupen, Verviers, Spa and Malmedy.

Part of the High Fens reserve remains closed during the spring breeding season of the endangered black grouse (Tetrao tetrix). During the summer there is a risk of fire in the forest area. Boardwalks cross the bogs, permitting access across these areas. Paths lead to many areas of the park, and there are signposts to guide visitors through the park. The nature reserve of the High Fens is coordinated under the Nature Division and Forests of the Walloon Region.

Climate
The reserve is one of the wettest and coldest parts of Belgium. It is frequently shrouded in mist and low cloud. It has a subalpine climate with strong winds and fierce winters, which are occasionally subarctic. However, beneath the fragile composition of the overlying soils are rocky beds and clay that prevent infiltration of water and thus create the conditions for wetlands, marshes and bogs.

The maximum number of frost days (when the temperature remains below ) in a year is reported to be 158 days and the minimum is 70 days.

Several rivers have their sources in the High Fens: the Vesdre, Hoëgne, Warche, Gileppe, Eau Rouge, Amblève, Our, Kyll, and Rur. In winter all the water sources freeze into snow making the High Fens one of the best ski resorts in Belgium. During winter the swamps appear as if "wrapped in white fluffy snow shawl".

Zoning
The region has been zoned under a regulation of 1992 into specific zones, keeping in view the access areas provided for visitors and tourists. The areas are allocated to three zones: B, C, and D. Zone B is open daily to the public subject to regulations: bicycles and dogs are forbidden; one must keep to identified tracks; waste is to be disposed of only in trashcans; and silence is to be maintained. Zone C can be visited only accompanied by a guide authorised by the park administration. However no access to this zone is allowed from mid-March to late June, when an endangered species, the black grouse, breeds here. Zone D is a totally protected reserve area, with no access to the public.

Flora and fauna

In the High Fens the habitats of many plants and animals typically found further north or in the mountains, result from the geology and relief, the harsh climate, high rainfall, long and cold winters and low average temperatures in the region.

The High Venn's plateau thus is rich in flora and fauna some of which have become rare and threatened in the last more than three centuries. The heathers and turf moors in the reserve have a significant role to maintain  biodiversity for the rare and threatened flora and fauna as it ensures regulation of the water balance and maintains value of the landscape. However, since the 17th century, peat cutting, drainage, inappropriate spruce plantations, infestation of the ground by the purple moor-grass, a herb, had caused problems for the ecology of the region. These negative aspects are now being rectified by special projects titled "Life-Nature Project".

Flora
The common heather or Calluna, a small bush of  height is grazed by sheep and also has healing qualities; the bilberry, in the family Ericaceae, is a shrub found at an altitude of 500 m (around 1600 feet); the rootless peat mosses (Sphagnum) of about  grow at  a year and form the basic turf moors through the buildup of organic matter; cotton grass, a perennial plant in wet regions; sundew (Drosera rotundfolia) found in the acid turfs of the reserve which are carnivores and consumes insects. The logo of the park is the seven-petalled flower of Chickweed-Wintergreen (Lysimachia europaea), not to be confused with other plants with similar names such as Chickweed (Cerastium spp.) or Wintergreen (Gaultheria spp.).

Fauna

Faunal species recorded are: the wild boar, roe deer, hen harrier, black grouse, wood mouse, grasshopper warbler, great grey shrike, meadow pipit, European stonechat and northern wheatear. The black grouse, a protected species, is found in small numbers. It is a sedentary bird. The male species has black plumage with a red wattle above the eyes while the female species has a brown plumage with black, grey and white stripes and possesses a light forked tail. Vertebrates, spiders and insects reported in the reserve are: orvet (Anguis fragilis), Odonata Orthoptera, Heteroptera Lepidoptera, diptera, crustaceans, myriapods and shellfish.

Fires

As the habitat consists of bogs, fire is a major hazard during the drought period, when the Fens are closed except for a small fen area near . Triangular signs painted in red are fixed at the fire hazard locations. In April 2011, in a fire that broke out in the High Fens,  of land were destroyed. Stated to be the biggest ever fire in the Fens, 300 firefighters supported by a helicopter were involved in dousing and controlling the fires.

Activities
The winter sports activities allowed in the Fens in specified area and outside conserved area of the fens are skiing, bicycling and trekking. Cross-country skiing in the High Fens is permitted on specified forest tracks which are located in the outskirts or even outside the nature reserve. Hiking trails have been reorganized outside the parks reserved areas. The walk routes would be limited to undergrowth adjacent to nature reserve. Bicycle routes have been specified outside the nature reserve in nearby forests. The subalpine climate may change to subarctic condition and hence when taking adventure walks in the night through the park it could be hazardous unless one is properly equipped for taking such a risk.

Monument
Another notable monument is at Gèyeté (Gayetay) within the municipal boundary of Sart and Jalhay; it is in memory of eight American airmen who were the crews of three Douglas C-47 Skytrains that collided in flight on 6 April 1945 due to fog. The memorial consists of a three-bladed propeller erected on a quartzite pedestal, with a cross erected next to it with the inscription "For the American airmen."

Gallery

Notes

External links

Geotagged information and pictures about the Bergervenn
Birds of High Fens 

Ardennes
Regions of the Eifel
Wallonia's Major Heritage
Regions of Wallonia
Mountain ranges of Europe
Areas of Belgium
Wetlands of Belgium
Wetlands of Germany
Bogs of North Rhine-Westphalia
Ski areas and resorts in Belgium
Landforms of Liège Province
Tourist attractions in Liège Province
Rhenish Massif
Landforms of Rhineland-Palatinate
German-speaking Community of Belgium
Ramsar sites in Belgium
World Heritage Tentative List